The qeleshe, plis, qylaf or kësul is a white brimless felt skull cap traditionally worn by Albanians. It has spread throughout Albanian-inhabited territories, and is today part of the traditional costume of the Albanians. The height and shape of the cap varies region to region.

Etymology

The word qeleshe comes from the Albanian word for wool (lesh). According to Vladimir Orel, the word plis comes from Proto-Albanian , related to Old High German  id., Latin  id. and Greek πῖλος  id., Proto-Slavic *pьlstь id.; according to Michael Driesen, Orel's reconstruction of Proto-Albanian  is incorrect.

Process
There are many ways to make the plis.  The most common way, in Kosovo, is using soap on the wool. The plis is always hand made. In the bazaar of Krujë, it is constructed by first getting a small chunk of wool that is placed on a table. Then, an instrument similar to a bow is used to beat the wool by hammering the string with a stone or a sturdy piece of wood. The wool is beaten and pressed until the wool strands become knotted around each other. Finally, it is washed, and shrinks.

It is then pressed by a flat wooden instrument on top of it, multiple times, until the wool becomes completely flat and smooth. Then, it is sealed in a flattener for 24 hours and soaked in hot water and salt. The hat is made by two finished, flattened and pressed wool.  The corners are removed to form a round shape. Afterwards, soap is added as a glue substitution to finely keep the fibres smooth while both pieces of wool are rubbed together.  Then it is washed and beaten to strengthen the fabric, and placed on a wooden model.
The shape of the plis is determined by the wooden model on which it is left to dry, and then rubbed with soap again to fix the shape. The wool will be smoothened with a razor. Lastly, a wooden instrument is firmly rubbed on the plis.

History
The Albanian plis/qeleshe has been handed down from Illyrian times.

The Illyrian hemispherical cap dates from the Iron Age, found both in men's and women's graves, hence it can be assumed that it was worn both by men and women. A monument from Illyrian times that was found in Zenica shows a calotte-shaped cap, very similar to the plis. The Albanian/Illyrian cap has been classified in a broader and general Mediterranean framework, relying on illustrations on situlae and girdle plates from the later Iron Age in Northern Italy and the Southern Alps. They also feature figures with hemispherical headgear with a small spike. The wearers of such caps are depicted carrying agricultural tools which leads to consider them as country people. Furthermore, in monuments from the 2nd and 3rd centuries AD from Bosnia, Illyrians under Roman rule are depicted with similar cap shapes. Such caps are absent in the eastern half of the Balkans, in the Pannonian-Carpathian region and in eastern Europe.

The 1542 Latin dictionary  equated an Albanian hat with a kyrbasia, and described it as a "tall pileus [hat] in the shape of a cone". An early depiction of the hemispherical plis can be seen on Johann Theodor de Bry depiction of Moisi Golemi from 1596, however, earlier Italian and documents exist depicting Albanians wearing the plis from earlier centuries. It is also argued by Nopcsa that it may have been coloured red. During the 17-19 centuries, the appearances description and appearances steadily multiplied, depicting it as a common Albanian headdress as it became more widespread and easily accessible to wear. The white version became the most popular one and was finally declared a specific Albanian national costume during the Albanian Renaissance.

In the 18-19 century, the plis became popularly depicted in painting depicting Arnaut, painters like Jean-Léon Gérôme, Charles Bargue and Marie-Gabriel-Florent-Auguste de Choiseul-Gouffier would paint Albanian subjects of the Osman Empire with the plis, as a diverse presentation of the orient. It would be casually depicted in a formal setting, such as in The Albanian Marriage by Jean Pierre Louis Laurent Hoüel in 1785, where the priest is depicted with a plis.

During the 19-20 century, Albanologists started taking photographs of Albanian national attires, many of which would include the Plis. Franz Nopcsa von Felső-Szilvás is photographed multiple times wearing the headdress. It then became a popular headdress for Albanian soldiers to wear during the battle for independence, Shota Galica, Isa Boletini and Azem Galica are depicted wearing the plis while fighting Italian, Turkish, Greek, Serbian and Montenegrin troops during the Partition of Albania. The plis formed part of the official uniform of the Waffen-SS Skanderbeg division and Albanian Legion.

Overview
The cap is part of the traditional costume of the Albanian highlanders and is considered as a national symbol among a large number of Albanian communities. During the Ottoman period, the hat as a white colored fez cap was the characteristic Albanian national headgear, in particular of Muslim Albanians.</ref>

In the northern Albanian highlands, the shape is hemispherical, while in Kukës, it is truncated. In southern Albania, the cap is taller than in northern Albania, especially in the Gjirokastër and Vlorë regions, with the exception of the Myzeqe low plains region. In some areas of southern Albania the cap has a small protrusion. The cap is made from one single piece of woolen felt, usually white, that is molded to the shape of the head.

The town of Kruja is particularly known for Albania's traditional felt-makers who also produce the felt caps qeleshe. The cap is used by men during the traditional weddings of the Tirana region.

Gallery

See also

Culture of Albania
List of hats and headgear
Pileus
 Labbade, similar headdress of Lebanese origin 
Opinga
Traditional clothing of Kosovo

References

Bibliography

Caps
Albanian clothing
Kosovan culture